Global economic crisis may refer to:
Economic events of the 21st Century:
Financial crisis of 2007–2008
 Great Recession
The 2020 stock market crash
A global recession
Earlier global economic events, such as:
The Great Depression, a global economic downturn from the late 1920s until World War II
The Long Depression, an international depression that began in 1873